The London uprising was a major event of the 1326 Invasion of England. Isabella of France, the wife of King Edward II, took the City of London, the principal city of the Kingdom of England, after her husband the King abandoned the Tower and fled to the west.

Events
In the spring of 1326, Isabella arranged a future marriage between her son Edward and Philippa, the daughter of William I, Count of Hainaut. Isabella claimed part of Philippa's dowry in advance so that she could finance her planned invasion of England. Her aim was to remove her husband from his throne and to replace him with their son.

In September, Isabella with her supporters, who included her lover Roger Mortimer, landed by the River Orwell in Suffolk. She had no difficulty in raising an army from those opposed to the king, and they advanced on London. As Isabella neared London, she evaded a force under the Earl of Winchester sent by Edward to intercept her. Isabella's army of some 1,500 men had fought its way deep into England already, King Edward remaining in London throughout.

Isabella moved yet closer to the capital, with Edward and his most loyal forces holding the Tower of London. However, London was against him, and fearing a heavy defeat the king decided to leave the city and head west with his supporters, including the Earl of Winchester and the other Despensers. The small royal army retreated speedily to Gloucester, leaving the way clear for Isabella and Mortimer to take London without a fight. Isabella had almost completed her campaign.

Edward II was captured shortly afterwards, deposed in parliament, imprisoned, and later died—probably murdered—in Berkeley Castle.

References

Sources

Sources
 timeref.com

Battles involving England
1326 in England
Conflicts in 1326
Uprising
Uprising
London